Mahjong is a four-player game of Chinese origin

Mahjong or Mah-Jong may also refer to:

 Mahjong solitaire, a tile-matching game usually played on a computer
 Japanese Mahjong, a Japanese version of mahjong
 Three player mahjong, a variant of mahjong
 Mahjongg (band), an indie band based in Chicago
 Mah-Jongg (lemur), a ring-tailed lemur
 Mahjong (film), a 1996 Taiwanese comedy film